Professor Nalin Mehta is an Indian political scientist, journalist, and writer. His latest book, The New BJP: Modi and the Making of the World's Largest Political Party, has been hailed as a "seminal", non-partisan revisionist account of the rise of the BJP in India.
Some of the world's leading scholars on India have called it a "classic", praising it as an "indispensable" and "masterful account" of the rise of the BJP. Its findings ignited a major global debate on Indian politics and caste

Mehta is currently Dean, School of Modern Media, UPES [upes]; Advisor, Global University Systems and Non-Resident Senior Fellow, Institute of South Asian Studies, National University of Singapore . He has previously
been executive editor of The Times of India Online, consulting editor of The Times of India; and managing editor, India Today (English TV news channel). He has also been associate professor at Shiv Nadar University;, founding editor of the international journal South Asian History and Culture. and founding co-director of the Times LitFest Delhi He was an adjunct professor at the Indian Institute of Management Bangalore and held senior positions with the Global Fund and UNAIDS.

Early life and education
Mehta studied at the Scindia School, where he finished as school captain and editor of the Scindia School Review. A Commonwealth-DFID scholar, he earned a Master of Arts in international relations from the University of East Anglia and a Ph.D. in political science from La Trobe University in Melbourne.

Career
Star TV CEO Uday Shankar has called Mehta "probably the best media academic in India" and the media guru Robin Jeffrey has described his work as "remarkable for being both a distinguished academic and an experienced journalist". Mehta's latest book Behind a Billion Screens: What Television Tells Us About Modern India, long-listed for Business Book of the Year by Tata Literary Live 2015 and was a national non-fiction bestseller.
 
Mehta's first book India on Television, widely acclaimed as a seminal, "impeccably researched" and "authoritative scholarly study" of the politics and business of television in India, was awarded the Asian Publishing Convention Award for Best Book in 2009.

His social history of Indian sport, Olympics: The India Story co-authored with historian Boria Majumdar, was welcomed as a "pioneering, long-awaited" work of history in the press and as a "triumph of Olympian proportions". India's most well-known sociologist Ashis Nandy called it " the first comprehensive, scholarly and yet lively account of India's experiences with the Olympics".

Mehta and Majumdar joined together again to write Sellotape Legacy, a detailed account of the politics, economics, and disaster of the Delhi Commonwealth Games in 2010. Former Indian sports minister Mani Shankar Aiyar called it a "blazing expose" and a "thorough, well-researched, sober, and absorbingly well-written indictment of Everything You Wanted to Know about CWG [Commonwealth Games] but were Afraid to Ask."

Mehta's other major work includes Gujarat Beyond Gandhi, a jointly edited anthology of critical essays that looked at 60 years of politics and social change in Gujarat.
 
Mehta has been Managing Editor of India Today's English news channel (2013–14), Deputy News Editor and prime-time anchor with Times Now. and a political correspondent and anchor with NDTV. For NDTV, he covered the 2002 Gujarat violence and subsequent state assembly elections, the 2001 Gujarat earthquake, the assassination of the royal family in Kathmandu and several Indian state elections including Chhattisgarh and Punjab.

Alongside leadership positions in the media industry and international development agencies, Mehta has held several visiting appointments at universities and institutions in Australia, Switzerland, Singapore, and India. These include National University of Singapore, Australian National University, Canberra, La Trobe University, Melbourne, and the International Olympic Museum in Lausanne, Switzerland.

Awards and recognition
 Asian Publishing Award for Best Book on Asian Media/Society for India on Television, 2009.
 Government of Australia Alumni Excellence Award for Media and Entertainment, 2010.
 Long-listed for Tata Literary Live Best Business Book of the Year, 2015, for Behind a Billion Screens: What Television Tells Us About Modern India

Books
 Dreams of a Billion: India and the Olympic Games, (HarperCollins, 2020)the most comprehensive account of India’s Olympic journey."
 Behind a Billion Screens: What Television Tells Us About Modern India, (HarperCollins, 2015), Longlisted for Business Book of the Year by Tata Literary Live, national non-fiction bestseller"
 India on Television: How Satellite TV Has Changed the Way We Think and Act (Harper Collins, 2008). Winner of Asian Publishing Award 2009 for Best Book Sellotape Legacy: Delhi and the Commonwealth Games 2010, with Boria Majumdar (Harper Collins, 2010).
 Olympics: The India Story, with Boria Majumdar (Harper Collins, 2008, 2012), republished as India and the Olympics (Routledge, 2009)
 Television in India: Satellites, Politics and Cultural Change (Editor. Routledge, 2008, 2009)
 Gujarat Beyond Gandhi: Politics, Conflict and Society, with Mona G. Mehta (Editor. Routledge, 2010, 2011).
 The Changing Face of Cricket: From Imperial to Global Game, with Dominic Malcolm & Jon Gemmell (Editor. Routledge, 2010).
 The New BJP: Modi and the Making of the World's Largest Political Party (Westland Books, 2022)

References 

Indian male journalists
Social historians
20th-century Indian historians
Scindia School alumni
Alumni of the University of East Anglia
La Trobe University alumni
Writers from Madhya Pradesh
Indian male essayists
Living people
Year of birth missing (living people)